Cerrillos is an underground metro station and the southern terminal station of Line 6 of the Santiago Metro network, in Santiago, Chile. It is underground, being the terminal station of Line 6, preceded by the Lo Valledor station. It is located at the intersection of Pedro Aguirre Cerda-Camino a Melipilla avenues with Departamental-Buzeta. The station was opened on 2 November 2017 as part of the inaugural section of the line, between Cerrillos and Los Leones.

Etymology
The station is located in the municipality of Cerrillos. The name of the district is reminiscent of the closed Los Cerrillos Airport, located where the Bicentennial Park City is currently located.

Originally the station was going to be named as Pedro Aguirre Cerda, however in January 2012 modifications were announced to the route of Line 6, with which the station was renamed Cerrillos.

References

External links 
Metro de Santiago website (in Spanish)

Santiago Metro stations
Railway stations opened in 2017
Santiago Metro Line 6